József Balázs (born 1 October 1965) is a Hungarian politician, member of the National Assembly (MP) for Gyöngyös, Heves County (Constituency III) between 2010 and 2014. He was a member of the Committee on Audit Office and Budget since 14 May 2010.

He served as mayor of Nagyréde from 1991 to 2014.

References

1965 births
Living people
Fidesz politicians
Members of the National Assembly of Hungary (2010–2014)
People from Gyöngyös
Mayors of places in Hungary